Turanose is a reducing disaccharide.  The -isomer is naturally occurring.  Its systematic name is α--glucopyranosyl-(1→3)-α--fructofuranose. It is an analog of sucrose not metabolized by higher plants, but rather acquired through the action of sucrose transporters for intracellular carbohydrate signaling. In addition to its involvement in signal transduction, -(+)-turanose can also be used as a carbon source by many organisms including numerous species of bacteria and fungi.

References

Disaccharides